John Bartholomew Wakelyn Nightingale, Baron of Cromarty (born 7 September 1960) is a British academic.

Biography
Nightingale was born 7 September 1960, the son of Michael and Hilary Nightingale. He is married to Lucy Fergusson, daughter of Drs. Patrick and Alison Fergusson, a partner at Linklaters LLP.

Nightingale was educated at Winchester College, Winchester, Hampshire, England. He graduated from Magdalen College, Oxford, with a Master of Arts and later with a Doctor of Philosophy (D.Phil.) as well. At Merton College, Oxford, he was the Harmsworth Senior Research Scholar between 1984 and 1986, and was a British Academy Postdoctoral Fellow from 1989-1992. In 1986, he became a Fellow of Magdalen College and later, from 1993, a Tutor of Modern History. He was Assessor of the University of Oxford from 2008-2009 and a member of its governing council from 2008-2014. He is also the current holder of a Scottish feudal barony.

Nightingale was an elected Fellow of the Governing Body of Winchester College from 2002-2017.

Works
 Hidden Magdalen (2008) (associate editor)
 Monasteries and Patrons in the Gorze Reform: Lotharingia c.850-1000 (2001)
 Oswald, Fleury and Continental Reform (1996)
 many articles on medieval history

References

1960 births
Living people
Fellows of Magdalen College, Oxford
People educated at Winchester College
Alumni of Magdalen College, Oxford
Alumni of Merton College, Oxford